Fairview Township is one of twelve townships in Caldwell County, Missouri, and is part of the Kansas City metropolitan area with the USA.  As of the 2000 census, its population was 161.

Fairview Township was established in 1869, and named after a school of the same name within its borders.

Geography

The streams of Dead Oak Branch, Flat Creek, Panther Creek and Turkey Creek run through this township.

References

External links
 US-Counties.com
 City-Data.com

Townships in Caldwell County, Missouri
Townships in Missouri
1869 establishments in Missouri